Karchana Thermal Power Station is a proposed coal-based thermal power plant located in Bara Tehsil in Allahabad district, Uttar Pradesh. The power plant will be owned and operated by Uttar Pradesh Rajya Vidyut Utpadan Nigam. Earlier the plant was supposed to be owned and operated by Sangam Power Generation Company, a subsidiary of the Jaypee Group but it backed-out due to land acquisition related issues.

This power plant is coming up at a site adjacent to another upcoming power project Bara Thermal Power Station which is owned by Prayagraj Power Generation, a subsidiary of the Jaypee Group.

Status updates
 May 2015: State government wants central govt to convert the Karchana power project into central government owned 4000 MW Ultra Mega Power Plant (UMPP).

Capacity
The planned capacity of the power plant in 1320 MW (2x660 MW).

References

Coal-fired power stations in Uttar Pradesh
Allahabad district